Şeydanur Kaplan (born 23 March 2000) is a Turkish Paralympian goalball player having visual impairment. She is a member of the national team taking part at the 2020 Summer Paralympics.

She won the silver medal at the 2017 European Goalball Championships in Lahti, Finland. At the 2018 Gpalball World Championships in Malmö, Sweden, she won the silver medal.

Honours

International
  2017 IBSA Goalball European Championship in Lahti, Finland.
  2018 Goalball World Championships in Malmö, Sweden
  2020 Summer Paralympics in Tokyo, Japan
  2021 IBSA Goalball European Championship in Samsun, Turkey.

References

2000 births
Living people
Sportspeople from Denizli
Turkish blind people
Turkish sportswomen
Female goalball players
Turkish goalball players
Goalball players at the 2020 Summer Paralympics
Paralympic goalball players of Turkey
21st-century Turkish women